Sawyers Bar is an unincorporated community located on the North Fork Salmon River in unincorporated Siskiyou County, California, not to be confused with a Sawyers or Lawyers Bar in Del Norte County.

History

Sawyers Bar, now in Siskiyou County was a California Gold Rush mining camp, first in Trinity County (one of the original counties of California, created in 1850 at the time of statehood).  Then following the rush to the Klamath and Salmon Rivers, it  became part of the now defunct Klamath County from 1851 to 1874.  It was then within that part of Klamath County annexed to Siskiyou County.  Sawyers Bar, was one of the largest gold producers in the county that year, along with Negro Flat, Gullion's Bar and Bestville. Currently, Sawyers Bar has a population of about 20 permanent residents and about 34 during the summer.

Climate

See also
 Bestville, California

References

Settlements formerly in Klamath County, California
Unincorporated communities in California
Unincorporated communities in Siskiyou County, California